Lauren Macuga (born 2 July 2002) is an American alpine ski racer on the U.S. Alpine Ski Development Team.

In 2019, she was just one of three women to join the U.S. national Alpine ski team. She is currently a student at Park City Winter Sports School and is coached by Jay Hey. Macuga also competed in the 2020 Winter Youth Olympics in alpine skiing and started in her first World Cup in December 2021.

Early life 
Macuga was born on July 2, 2002, in Park City, Utah. She began competing in skiing at seven years old.

Career 
In 2011, Macuga joined the Park City Ski and Snowboard's club team at the age of 8. In the same year, she was invited to participate in NASTAR nationals and championed her age group. Macuga attends Park City Winter Sports School and participates in the Park City Ski & Snowboard Club.

Macuga joined the Park City Ski & Snowboard FIS women's team for the first time in 2019, trained by Jay Hey. Because she had no previous racing experience, Macuga had to work her way up from 990th place by participating and placing in various FIS events. Macuga placed 3rd in the last race of the FIS season, giving her enough points to qualify to be a US Team nominee at 445th place. Her place on the Team was confirmed a month later by U.S. Ski and Snowboard Alpine development director Chip Knight, and she is one of two women from Utah on the team.

On March 18, 2019, Macuga made her debut in the Nor-Am Cup in Downhill skiing at the Sugarloaf ski resort.

She has been on the U.S. Ski & Snowboard Alpine D Team for 3 years after first joining the team in 2020. Alongside Zoe Zimmerman, Macuga was one of the first two mentees of Alice Merryweather.

References 

2002 births
Living people
American female alpine skiers
Alpine skiers at the 2020 Winter Youth Olympics
People from Park City, Utah